John Handyside (Jack) Barnes MBE (1922–1985) was a physician and toxinologist in Queensland, Australia. Born in Charleville he is known for his research on the box jellyfish. Amongst other things, he established that their toxin would not discharge on a synthetic surface and so wore pantyhose when collecting specimens, a practice now adopted by lifesavers at risk of jellyfish stings.

References

Australian Members of the Order of the British Empire
Australian scientists
1922 births
1985 deaths
People from Queensland
People educated at Brisbane Grammar School
University of Queensland alumni